Voluntarism, sometimes referred to as voluntary action, is the principle that individuals are free to choose goals and how to achieve them within the bounds of certain societal and cultural constraints, as opposed to actions that are coerced or predetermined.
The term "voluntarism" is derived from Latin word "voluntary," which means 'will'. The term voluntary association is variously defined. Voluntary organizations are known by several other names : Non-Government Organisations(NGOS), private voluntary organizations(PVOS) and so on depending on the geographic area and time period of reference. In general these organizations, regardless of terminology used, have certain characteristics; that they are non-government and non profit, that they are voluntary. The term NGO has become popular in the 1980s and 1990s and is extensively used in the field of development, where as the term "voluntary organization" had been used widely for social welfare and charity organizations. But these two terms are used interchangeably as both denote the same characteristics.

Volunteerism
Volunteer management specialist Susan J. Ellis differentiates between "voluntarism" and "volunteerism":

"Voluntarism" (the older term) refers to everything voluntary. In the United States this includes religion. It certainly encompasses the entire "voluntary sector," but "voluntary" in the "voluntarism" context means not mandated by law (as government is). Many voluntary sector (nonprofit) agencies have a volunteer board because that is a legal requirement, but may not utilize volunteers in direct service in any way. There are subjects within "voluntarism" that have nothing to do with volunteers, such as Unrelated Business Income Tax legislation, proposal writing, and compensation law.

Varieties

Voluntary provision of services to religious, civil, medical, educational, environmental and other private or governmental organizations doubtless has a long history. Such volunteer efforts keep expenses down for non-profit and philanthropic organizations, empower individuals and groups to help others, and make volunteers feel needed.

Voluntarism flourished in the 19th and early 20th centuries and was empowering especially to the women who had been excluded from political participation outside the home. Women's organizations dealt with social problems created by rapid industrialization and urbanization, and by massive immigration which were not addressed by institutions of the time and had a great influence on American political culture.

Voluntarism is also used to describe non-coercive methods of recruiting soldiers, from participants in European and American military service to youthful combatants in civil war in Sierra Leone.

Voluntarism has been a phrase used in labor relations.  In Britain, it means the state refrains from directly intervening in industrial relations. In the early American labor movement it meant trade unions should focus on "pure and simple" gains in wages and working conditions and not independent labor politics and industrial unionism.

In his book Willful Liberalism: Voluntarism and Individuality in Political Theory and Practice, Johns Hopkins University political science professor Richard E. Flathman argues that liberals must understand more about individuality and self-reliance and self-responsibility and therefore be more open of acceptance of voluntary action and less concerned with ordering political society. He notes, "Americans of all ages, all conditions, and all dispositions constantly form associations," which he describes as "of a thousand other kinds, religious, moral, serious, futile, general or restricted, enormous or diminutive".

In sociology, voluntarism is an important aspect of the action theory of Talcott Parsons, as well as other theories of social action and agency.

Voluntaryists, free market advocates, libertarians and anarchists call for voluntary efforts to replace most or all government efforts, using both moral and utilitarian arguments.

Examples from American history

Voluntary provision of services to the religious, civil, medical, educational, environmental and other private or governmental organizations doubtless has a long history.
 William Penn, who established the Quakers in the late 17th century, preached taking responsibility for others and improving the world.
 Cotton Mather, who lived during the colonial period, encouraged the formation of associations and causes.
 Benjamin Franklin organized a voluntary militia in Quaker-controlled Pennsylvania, whose pacifist legislature refused to support the American revolutionary war.
 Alexis de Tocqueville noted the unusually large number of voluntary associations in America.
 The Underground Railroad was a network of volunteers who helped slaves escape from their captors in the South.
 Dorothea Dix, a nurse, recruited and trained other women as nurses during the Civil War.
 Clara Barton also served as a Civil War nurse and went on to establish the American Red Cross in 1881 for relief of natural disasters, such as earthquakes.
 Jane Addams opened a settlement house in 1889 to teach volunteers how to help the poor improve their lives.
 In 1995, 93 million Americans volunteered an average of 4.3 hours per week.

See also
 Structure and agency
 Symbolic interactionism
 Virtual volunteering

References

External links
 Landscapes of voluntarism, New spaces of health, welfare and governance, Christine Milligan and David Conradson, editors.
 
 
 

Anarchist theory
Civil society
Free will
Libertarian theory
Social theories